= Pakistan Human Development Fund =

The Pakistan Human Development Fund (PHDF) (Urdu: صندوقِ سرمایہَ پاکستان برائے انسانی ترقی) is located in Islamabad, Pakistan.
